Constantinos Philippou (born November 29, 1979) is a retired Greek-Cypriot mixed martial artist. He formerly fought for the UFC's Middleweight division.

Early life
Philippou was born in Limassol on 29 November 1979.

Career

Boxing
Philippou began boxing in 1994 and had his first fight six months later. In 2005, his best friend and coach Polis encouraged him to move to the United States to become a professional. Costas fought in the Golden Gloves two months after coming to the United States, but lost in the finals at Madison Square Garden by a split decision to Nagy Aguilera. Philippou then turned pro and had three fights three wins, the third being featured on ESPN. Costas transitioned to MMA after disputes with his manager and coach.

MMA
Philippou made his professional MMA debut in May 2008 for the Ring of Combat promotion, losing to fellow future UFC fighter Ricardo Romero by split decision. However, he subsequently amassed a record of 7 wins, 1 loss and 1 no contest within that promotion.  Philippou had previously trained with the Serra-Longo Fight Team, but as of May 30, 2013 he decided to switch camps to Bellmore Kickboxing Academy.  According to Matt Serra, Philippou left the team on good terms.

The Ultimate Fighter 11
Philippou first made his appearance in the UFC on The Ultimate Fighter: Team Liddell vs. Team Ortiz. However, he never made it as part of the cast to move into the house after losing to Joseph Henle via submission in the opening elimination bout.

Ultimate Fighting Championship
Philippou got a second chance in the UFC after stepping in as a late replacement for Dan Miller, who was moved up the card to face Nate Marquardt, facing Nick Catone at UFC 128 in a catchweight bout of 195 pounds. He lost the fight via unanimous decision.

Philippou was expected to face BJJ black belt Rafael Natal on August 6, 2011 at UFC 133, replacing an injured Riki Fukuda. However, an injury forced Alessio Sakara out of his main card bout against Jorge Rivera, and Philippou was pulled from his bout with Natal and named as Sakara's replacement against Rivera. Philippou won the fight via split decision, earning his first UFC victory.

Philippou faced off against Jared Hamman on December 10, 2011 at UFC 140. He won the match via KO at 3:11 in the first round.

Philippou fought TUF 11 winner Court McGee on March 3, 2012 at UFC on FX 2. He won the fight via unanimous decision after a back and forth bout.

Philippou next defeated Riki Fukuda via unanimous decision on July 7, 2012 at UFC 148.

Philippou was expected to face Nick Ring on November 17, 2012 at UFC 154 however, the fight was cancelled on the day of the event as Ring fell ill.

Philippou replaced his injured training partner Chris Weidman against Tim Boetsch at UFC 155 on December 29, 2012. Philippou was victorious with a third round TKO stoppage.

Philippou was expected to face Ronaldo Souza on May 18, 2013 at UFC on FX 8.  However, Philippou pulled out of the bout in early May, citing a cut above his eye, and was replaced by Chris Camozzi.

Philippou next faced Francis Carmont at UFC 165. He lost the fight via unanimous decision (30-26, 30-27, 30-27).

Philippou faced Luke Rockhold on January 15, 2014 at UFC Fight Night 35. He lost the fight via KO in the first round.

Philippou faced Lorenz Larkin in the co-main event at UFC Fight Night 40.  He won the fight via knockout in the first round.

Philippou was expected to face Uriah Hall on January 18, 2015 at UFC Fight Night 59, however, Philippou would be forced out the bout due to injury.

Philippou faced Gegard Mousasi on May 16, 2015 at UFC Fight Night 66. He lost the fight by unanimous decision.

On July 7, 2015, Philippou retired from MMA. Earlier in the day, he made his Twitter account private, with an avatar that read, "THIS ACCOUNT IS NO LONGER IN SERVICE. PLEASE UNFOLLOW." The UFC then confirmed via Twitter that he had told them of his retirement.

Personal life
Philippou resides in New York City.

Championships and accomplishments
Ring of Combat
ROC Middleweight Championship (1 time)

Mixed martial arts record

|-
|Loss
|align=center|13–5 (1)
|Gegard Mousasi
|Decision (unanimous)
|UFC Fight Night: Edgar vs. Faber
|
|align=center|3
|align=center|5:00
|Pasay, Philippines
|
|-
|Win
|align=center| 13–4 (1)
|Lorenz Larkin
|KO (punches)
|UFC Fight Night: Brown vs. Silva
|
|align=center|1
|align=center|3:27
|Cincinnati, Ohio, United States
|
|-
|Loss
|align=center| 12–4 (1)
|Luke Rockhold
|TKO (body kick)
|UFC Fight Night: Rockhold vs. Philippou
|
|align=center|1
|align=center|2:31
|Duluth, Georgia, United States
|
|-
|  Loss
|align=center| 12–3 (1)
| Francis Carmont
| Decision (unanimous)
| UFC 165
| 
|align=center| 3
|align=center| 5:00
|Toronto, Ontario, Canada
|
|-
| Win
|align=center| 12–2 (1)
| Tim Boetsch
| TKO (punches)
| UFC 155
| 
|align=center| 3
|align=center| 2:11
|Las Vegas, Nevada, United States
|
|-
| Win
|align=center| 11–2 (1)
| Riki Fukuda
| Decision (unanimous)
| UFC 148
| 
|align=center| 3
|align=center| 5:00
|Las Vegas, Nevada, United States
|
|-
| Win
|align=center| 10–2 (1)
| Court McGee
| Decision (unanimous)
| UFC on FX: Alves vs. Kampmann
| 
|align=center| 3
|align=center| 5:00
|Sydney, Australia
|
|-
| Win
|align=center| 9–2 (1)
|  Jared Hamman
| KO (punches)
| UFC 140
| 
|align=center|1
|align=center|3:11
|Toronto, Ontario, Canada
|
|-
| Win
|align=center| 8–2 (1) 
|  Jorge Rivera
| Decision (split)
| UFC 133
| 
|align=center| 3
|align=center| 5:00
|Philadelphia, Pennsylvania, United States
|
|-
|  Loss
|align=center| 7–2 (1)
|  Nick Catone
| Decision (unanimous)
| UFC 128
| 
|align=center| 3
|align=center| 5:00
|Newark, New Jersey, United States
| 
|-
| Win
|align=center| 7–1 (1)
|  Uriah Hall
| Decision (majority)
| Ring of Combat 34
| 
|align=center| 3
|align=center| 4:00
|Atlantic City, New Jersey, United States
| 
|-
| Win
|align=center| 6–1 (1)
|  Aung La N Sang
| TKO (punches)
| Ring of Combat 33
| 
|align=center| 1
|align=center| 0:11
|Atlantic City, New Jersey, United States
| 
|-
| NC
|align=center| 5–1 (1)
|  Marcus Finch
| NC (groin kick)
| Ring of Combat 32
| 
|align=center| 2
|align=center| 2:47
|Atlantic City, New Jersey, United States
| 
|-
| Win
|align=center| 5–1
|  Victor O'Donnell
| Decision (unanimous)
| Ring of Combat 26
| 
|align=center| 3
|align=center| 5:00
|Atlantic City, New Jersey, United States
|
|-
| Win
|align=center| 4–1
|  Aaron Meisner
| Submission (rear-naked choke)
| Ring of Combat 23
| 
|align=center| 1
|align=center| 2:27
|Atlantic City, New Jersey, United States
| 
|-
| Win
|align=center| 3–1
|  John Doyle
| TKO (punches)
| Ring of Combat 22
| 
|align=center| 3
|align=center| 3:05
|Atlantic City, New Jersey, United States
| 
|-
| Win
|align=center| 2–1
|  Brendan Barrett
| TKO (doctor stoppage)
| Ring of Combat 21
| 
|align=center| 1
|align=center| 3:29
|Atlantic City, New Jersey, United States
| 
|-
| Win
|align=center| 1–1
|  Tony Andreocci
| KO (punch)
| Ring of Combat 20
| 
|align=center| 1
|align=center| 0:22
|Atlantic City, New Jersey, United States
| 
|-
| Loss
|align=center| 0–1
|  Ricardo Romero
| Decision (split)
| Ring of Combat 19
| 
|align=center| 3
|align=center| 5:00
|Atlantic City, New Jersey, United States
|

See also
 List of current UFC fighters
 List of male mixed martial artists

References

External links

Official UFC Profile

1979 births
Living people
American people of Greek Cypriot descent
Cypriot male mixed martial artists
Middleweight mixed martial artists
Sportspeople from Limassol
Cypriot practitioners of Brazilian jiu-jitsu
Cypriot expatriate sportspeople in the United States
Ultimate Fighting Championship male fighters